This article is a list of places and things named after Pope Francis since his inauguration.

List
 Club Deportivo Papa Francisco, an Argentine semi-professional football club
 Francis, a cologne made by Excelsis Fine Fragrances
 Francis House, an initiative of the Bambino Gesù Hospital for underprivileged mothers and children
 Francisco, an Australian-made passenger ferry
 Papa Francisco, an avenue in the Argentine city of La Plata
 Pope Francis Complex Center for the Poor, a Philippine center in Palo, Leyte, Philippines, comprising a home for the elderly, a clinic, an orphanage, and a chapel
 Pope Francis Faith Award, a prize of the Bishops' Conference of Scotland
 Pope Francis Gawad Kalinga Village, a Philippine settlement in Bantayan, Cebu for survivors of the Typhoon Haiyan
 The Pope Francis Center for the Poor - Palo, Leyte, Philippines
 Pope Francis High School, a school in Springfield, Massachusetts
 Pope Francis House, a Habitat for Humanity house in Asheville, North Carolina
 Pope Francis Global Academy, a Catholic elementary school in Chicago, Illinois
 Pope Francis Catholic School, a new name for a Catholic elementary school in Toronto, Ontario, Canada as a merger of St. Luke and Senhor Santo Cristo schools in Ossington Village. First Canadian school to be named after him.
 Pope Francis Viaduct, a new name given to a recently constructed viaduct in Guatemala City, Guatemala in April 2015. It connects 2 important roadways in the city such as Zona 10 in the south and the roadway known as Carretera A El Salvador on the east in Guatemala City.

See also 
 List of places named after Pope John Paul II

References

External links 

2010s-related lists
Francis
Works about Pope Francis
Vatican City-related lists